Parul Yadav is an Indian actress and producer who works primarily in Kannada films along with a few Malayalam and Tamil films. She made her acting debut with the Tamil film Dreams, starring Dhanush and Diya.

Early life and career
She made her acting debut in the 2004 Tamil film Dreams, starring Dhanush and Diya. She switched over to television with the daily soap-opera Bhagyavidhaata, which has aired on Colors since 2009. This was soon followed by the comedy reality show Comedy Ka Maha Muqabala on Star Plus, where she was a participant representing the team Raveena Ke Mohre.

In 2011, she made her Kannada film debut in Shivarajkumar's movie Bandhu Balaga as his sister-in-law. Later, she acted in Govindaya Namaha, which went on to become one of the highest-grossing films of that year. She played Mumtaz, a Muslim girl falling in love with Govinda, played by Komal Kumar. Her portrayal won her a SIIMA Best Debutant award (2013) and Bangalore Times Best Newcomer Award (2013) and a nomination in the Udaya Film Awards for the best actor category for that year. The song "Pyarge Aagbittaite", which featured Yadav, earned her more attention. The same pairing in the 2012 film Nandeesha, however, could not continue the success at the box office.

Yadav's next project was for the multi-starrer film Bachchan, directed by Shashank and starring Sudeep. Yadav then starred in Shivajinagara, produced by Ramu Films. She was paired opposite Duniya Vijay. The movie was a blockbuster having completed 100 days of screening in theatres.

In 2014, Yadav signed for two movies that became landmark projects of her career, Vaastu Prakaara and Uppi 2. She played an advocate in Vaastu Prakaara, which was directed by renowned film-maker Yogaraj Bhat. In Uppi 2, she is seen in a cameo opposite its director Upendra. Her latest release is K. M. Chaitanya's Aatagara, featuring an ensemble cast and Jessie. Her performance in Jessie won her widespread appreciation. Upcoming films of Yadav include Seizer and Vijayaditya.

Yadav's biggest movie of her career is Killing Veerappan, directed in multiple languages by Ram Gopal Varma. Kannada actor Shiva Rajkumar plays a police officer and Yadav is paired with him. Killing Veerappan was also be dubbed and released in Tamil and Telugu.

In 2017, Yadav shot for the film Butterfly, a remake of the Hindi film Queen, directed in four languages by Ramesh Aravind and Neelakanta (director). Besides the lead role, Yadav is also the co-producer.

Filmography

Film

{| class="wikitable sortable"
|-
! Year !! Film !! Role !! Language !! Notes
|2001|| Mere Agosh Mein Ramona|| Hindi||
|-
|2004 || Dreams || Charu|| Tamil ||
|-
|2005 || Krithyam || Sandra Punnoose || rowspan=2| Malayalam || 
|-
|2008 || Bullet || Gayathri || 
|-
|2008 ||Bandhu Balaga || Rani || Kannada || 
|-
|2009 || Black Dalia || Linda D'Souza || Malayalam || 
|-
|2012 || Govindaya Namaha || Mumtaz || rowspan="5" | Kannada || 
|-
|2012 || Nandeesha || Sonia ||
|-
|2013 || Bachchan || Anjali || 
|-
|2013 || Shravani Subramanya ||Benne || Special appearance
|-
|2014 || Shivajinagara || Pavithra|| 
|-
|2015 || Pulan Visaranai 2 ||Sonya Varma || Tamil||
|-
|2015 || Vaastu Prakaara || Nirmala || rowspan="7" |Kannada|| 
|-
|2015 || Uppi 2 || Sheela ||Extended cameo
|-
|2015 ||  Aatagara || Mallika || 
|-
|2016 || Killing Veerappan || Shreya || 
|-
|2016 || Jessie  || Nandini ||
|-
|2018 || Seizer || Divya||
|-
|}

Television
 2007 – Yes Boss – SAB TV
 2009 – Bhagyavidhaata – Colors
 2011 – Comedy Ka Maha Muqabala – Star Plus
 2015 – Darr Sabko Lagta Hai'' (episode nine) – &TV

Awards

References

External links

 Official website
 
 

Living people
Actresses from Mumbai
Indian television actresses
Indian film actresses
Actresses in Malayalam cinema
Actresses in Kannada cinema
Actresses in Tamil cinema
Actresses in Hindi cinema
Female models from Mumbai
Filmfare Awards South winners
21st-century Indian actresses
Actresses in Hindi television
Actresses from Bangalore
Female models from Bangalore
South Indian International Movie Awards winners
1989 births